The National Collegiate Athletic Association (NCAA), founded in 1906, is the major governing body for intercollegiate athletics in the United States and currently conducts national championships in its sponsored sports, except for the top level of football. Before the NCAA offered a championship for any particular sport, intercollegiate national championships in that sport were determined independently. Although the NCAA sometimes lists these historic championships in its official records, it has not awarded retroactive championship titles.

Prior to NCAA inception of a sport, intercollegiate championships were conducted and usually espoused in advance as competitions for the national championship. Many winners were recognized in contemporary newspapers and other publications as the "national intercollegiate" champions. These are not to be confused with the champions of early 20th-century single-sport alliances of northeastern U.S. colleges that were named "Intercollegiate League" or "Intercollegiate Association." These leagues generally included some of the colleges that later became the Ivy League, as well as an assortment of other northeastern universities.

Even after the NCAA began organizing national championships, some non-NCAA organizations conducted their own national championship tournaments, usually as a supplement to the NCAA events. A notable example is that of NCAA Division III men's volleyball. Although the NCAA Men's National Collegiate Volleyball Championship, established in 1970, was in theory open to D-III schools, none had received a berth in that tournament. As a result, a separate championship event, open only to D-III schools, was created in 1997. That event was discontinued after its 2011 edition once the NCAA announced it would sponsor an official Division III championship starting in 2012.

The historical championship event outcomes included in the primary list section were decided by actual games organized for the purpose of determining a champion on the field of play. Lists of other championships for collegiate athletic organizations are referenced in later sections (see Table of Contents). It does not include Helms Athletic Foundation or Premo-Porretta Power Poll selections, which were awarded retrospectively.

Championship game outcomes prior/concurrent to NCAA inception

Men's teams

Baseball
1893 Yale def. Amherst, 9-0

Tournament was played at the Chicago World's Fair and included Virginia, Illinois, Wisconsin, Vanderbilt, Yale, Amherst, Wesleyan and Vermont. William McKinley attended the opening game. It was organized by the Columbian National Inter-Collegiate Baseball Association, notably by its secretary, Amos Alonzo Stagg, then the new head football coach at the University of Chicago.

NCAA from 1947.

Basketball
1904 Hiram College won the 1904 Olympic Games collegiate championship tournament, def. Wheaton College, 25–20, and Latter-Day Saints University (later, Brigham Young University), 25–18.
1908 Chicago def. Pennsylvania, 2 games to 0 (21–18, 16–15)
Amateur Athletic Union annual United States championship – College teams were runners-up in 1915, 1917, 1920, 1921, 1932, and 1934. Four college teams won the championship (final game results):

1916 Utah def. Illinois Athletic Club, 28–27
1920 New York University def. Rutgers, 49–24
1924 Butler (Indiana) def. Kansas City Athletic Club, 30–26
1925 Washburn College (Kansas) def. Hillyard Shine Alls, 42–30

1920 Pennsylvania def. Chicago, 2 games to 1 (24–28, 29–18, 23–21)
1922 Wabash College (Indiana) won the first national intercollegiate championship tournament, which was held in Indianapolis. Five 1922 conference champions and a runner-up from these conferences participated: Pacific Coast Conference, Southern Intercollegiate Athletic Association, Western Pennsylvania League, Illinois Intercollegiate Athletic Conference, Michigan Intercollegiate Athletic Association and Indiana Intercollegiate Athletic Association.  The Western Conference and Eastern Intercollegiate League declined invitations to participate.
1930 Pittsburgh def. Montana State 37–36 in contest billed as a "championship game" according to the Naismith Memorial Basketball Hall of Fame.
1938 Temple def. Colorado, 60–36 in first National Invitation Tournament

NCAA from 1939.

1939–1950 NIT winners:

1939  Long Island
1940  Colorado
1941  Long Island
1942  West Virginia
1943  St. John's
1944  St. John's 

1945  DePaul 
1946  Kentucky 
1947  Utah 
1948  Saint Louis
1949  San Francisco
1950  City College of New York (also won NCAA)

1954 Holy Cross claims a national championship for its 1954 NIT victory.

1943–1945 Red Cross War Benefit Games:
1943 Wyoming, winner of NCAA tournament, def. NIT champion, St. John's, 52-47 (OT)
1944 Utah, winner of NCAA tournament, def. NIT champion, St. John's, 43-36
1945 Oklahoma A&M, winner of NCAA tournament, def. NIT champion, DePaul, 52–44

Boxing
1924 Penn State def. Navy, 18–16
1925 Navy def. Penn State, 23–11
1926 Navy def. Penn State, 15–13
1927 Penn State def. Navy, 22–21
1928 Navy def. Penn State, 19–18
1929 Penn State def. Navy, 23–13
1930 Penn State def. Western Maryland, 19–14
1931 Navy def. Western Maryland, 20–16
NCAA from 1932–1960.

Cross country
Inter-Collegiate Cross Country Association (1899–1907)
Inter-Collegiate Association of Amateur Athletes of America (1908–37)

1899  Cornell
1900  Cornell
1901  Yale
1902  Cornell
1903  Cornell
1904  Cornell
1905  Cornell
1906  Cornell
1907  Cornell
1908  Cornell
1909  Cornell
1910  Cornell
1911  Cornell

1912  Harvard
1913  Cornell
1914  Cornell
1915  Maine
1916  Cornell
1917  Pennsylvania
1918  not held
1919  Syracuse
1920  Cornell
1921  Cornell
1922  Syracuse
1923  Syracuse
1924  Pittsburgh

1925  Syracuse
1926 Penn State
1927  Penn State
1928  Penn State
1929  Pennsylvania
1930  Penn State
1931  Harvard
1932  Manhattan
1933  Michigan State
1934  Michigan State
1935  Michigan State
1936  Michigan State
1937  Michigan State

NCAA from 1938.

Fencing
Intercollegiate Fencing Association (1894–1943)

Team Foils

 1894  Harvard
 1895  Harvard
 1896  Harvard
 1897  Harvard
 1898  Columbia
 1899  Harvard
 1900  Harvard
 1901  Navy
 1902  Army
 1903  Army

 1904  Army
 1905  Navy
 1906  Army
 1907  Navy
 1908  Army
 1909  Army
 1910  Navy
 1911  Cornell
 1912  Army
 1913  Columbia

 1914  Columbia
 1915  Navy
 1916  Navy
 1917  Navy
 1918  Columbia
 1919  Columbia
 1920  Navy
 1921  Navy
 1922  Navy

Three-Weapon Championship

 1923  Army †
 1924  Navy
 1925  tie: Yale, Navy
 1926  Yale
 1927  Army
 1928  Yale
 1929  Yale
 1930  tie: Yale, Army

 1931  Army
 1932  Yale
 1933  New York Univ.
 1934  Columbia
 1935  New York Univ.
 1936  New York Univ.
 1937  New York Univ.

 1938  New York Univ.
 1939  Navy
 1940  New York Univ.
 1941  New York Univ.
 1942  New York Univ.
 1943  Navy
 1944–47  not held

† The first IFA three-weapon trophy was awarded in 1923. However, all three weapons (foil, épée, saber) were contested in the IFA tournament as early as 1920.

NCAA 1941–42 and from 1947.

Football

The National Collegiate Athletic Association (NCAA) has never conducted a national championship event at the highest level of college football, currently its Division I Football Bowl Subdivision (FBS). Neither has the NCAA ever officially endorsed an FBS national champion. Since 1978, it has held a championship playoff at the next lower level of college play.  Prior to 1978, no divisions separated teams, and champions were independently designated by "selectors," composed of individuals and third-party organizations using experts, polls, and mathematical methods. These efforts have continued and thrived for the higher FBS level.  From the beginning, the selectors' choices have frequently been at odds with each other. The NCAA has documented both contemporaneous and retroactive choices of several major national selectors in its official NCAA Football Records Book. These selections are often claimed as championships by individual schools.

Golf
1897–1938

See Pre-NCAA college golf champions

NCAA from 1939.

Gymnastics
1899 No team title. Yale gymnasts won 4 out of 6 individual events, shared a tie for victory in one event and also won the individual all-around. 19 schools participated.
1900 Columbia def. 2nd place Yale, 26 – 17
1901 Yale def. 2nd place Columbia, 20 – 14
1902 Yale def. 2nd-place Columbia, 16 – 15

In 1903, the Western Conference instituted an annual conference championship meet.  Although early interest was expressed by the Intercollegiate Association in establishing a recognized national championship event with the Western Conference, that interest did not reach fruition.  In later years, the University of Chicago, a perennial Western Conference power, participated in several of the annual championship meets of the Intercollegiate Association.

1917 Chicago def. 2nd-place Haverford, 14½ – 10
1918  not held
1919  not held
1925 Navy def. Chicago, 33 – 12, in a dual meet between winners of the Intercollegiate and Western Conference championship meets.
"[I]n the twenty year period from 1910 to (the end of 1929) ... Navy has participated in 91 tournaments and dual meets and won 87 of them, including all seven of the intercollegiate championship events entered." (Those seven events were conference, not national, championships.)  Navy was so strong that the Intercollegiate Association asked Navy not to participate in the 1926 championship meet.  Navy was not a participant in the 1926, 1927 and 1928 meets.
1944 Penn State won the National AAU team title during a five-year hiatus in the NCAA championships for World War II.

NCAA from 1938.

Ice hockey

Amateur Athletic Union conducted annual National Ice Hockey Championships during 1931–1948, except during most of the World War II years. College teams won the championship on at least two occasions:

1940 Minnesota def. Amesbury, 9–4, and Brock-Hall, 9–1
1942 Boston College def. High Standard H.C., 3–2, Massena H.C., 9–8, and defending champion St. Nicholas H.C., 6–4
NCAA from 1948.

Lacrosse
1881 Harvard def. Princeton, 3-0
The first intercollegiate lacrosse tournament was held in 1881 with Harvard beating Princeton in the championship game. New York University and Columbia University also participated. From 1882 through 1970 (excepting 1932–1935), the United States Intercollegiate Lacrosse Association and the collegiate lacrosse associations from which it evolved chose annual champions based on season records. These associations were the ILA (1882–1905), IULL (1899–1905), USILL (1906–1925) and USILA (1926–1970).  In 1912 and 1921, the USILL conducted championship games between the winners of its Northern and Southern Divisions. Efforts to conduct such games in other years during its existence were unsuccessful.

1912 Harvard def. Swarthmore, 7–3
1921 Lehigh def. Syracuse, 3–1

NCAA from 1971.

Rifle
National Rifle Association

National Indoor Intercollegiate Match
1924–79
Men/Coed (year of conversion to Coed undetermined)

In the contemporary press, the type of competition utilized for this match was referred to as "shoulder-to-shoulder."   This distinguished it from the "telegraphic" or "postal" form of competition.

 1924 US Naval Academy

 1925 US Naval Academy

 1926 US Naval Academy
 1927 George Washington

 1928 * George Washington
 1929 Iowa
 1930 US Naval Academy
 1931 US Naval Academy
 1932 Cincinnati
 1933 Minnesota
 1934 US Naval Academy

 1935 US Naval Academy
 1936 Carnegie Institute of Tech. (PA)
 1937 US Naval Academy
 1938 George Washington
 1939 US Naval Academy
 1940 Iowa
 1941 Minnesota
 1942 US Military Academy

 1943–45 No competition
 1946 † Iowa
 1947 Maryland
 1948 US Naval Academy
 1949 Maryland
 1950 US Military Academy
 1951 MIT
 1952 California
 1953 Maryland
 1954 Maryland
 1955 California
 1956 Nevada-Reno
 1957 California
 1958 California
 1959 California
 1960 Oregon State
 1961 West Virginia
 1962 Oregon State
 1963 The Citadel

 1964 West Virginia
 1965 US Military Academy
 1966 West Virginia
 1967 US Naval Academy
 1968 tie: Murray State, Montana State
 1969 US Naval Academy
 1970 Murray State
 1971 Tennessee Tech
 1972 Tennessee Tech
 1973 Tennessee Tech
 1974 East Tennessee State
 1975 US Military Academy
 1976 Texas Christian
 1977 Tennessee Tech
 1978 Murray State
 1979 Tennessee Tech

NCAA from 1980.

* The Intercollegiate Rifle Team Trophy was presented to the NRA by the Sons of the American Revolution in 1928, when it was first awarded for annual rifle competition.

† NRA document states that there was no competition in 1946.

NRA Intercollegiate League
1909–22

Competition was held in telegraphic form using the indoor ranges of each competing school.

 1909 Washington State
 1910 Washington State
 1911 Iowa
 1912  Massachusetts Agricultural
 1913 West Virginia

 1914  Michigan Agricultural
 1915  Washington State
 1916  Michigan Agricultural
 1917  Michigan Agricultural
 1918  Iowa

 1919  Pennsylvania
 1920  Norwich
 1921 Norwich
 1922  Pennsylvania

NRA Gallery Indoor Championship
1908 – ?

The indoor intercollegiate match was a single annual indoor match open to teams of any college.  It was held in telegraphic form using the indoor ranges of each competing school.

 1908 Columbia
 1909 Washington State

 1910 Massachusetts Agricultural
 1911 Massachusetts Agricultural
 1912–22 ?

 1923 Georgetown
 1924  George Washington
 1925 Washington
 1926 ?
 1927 Norwich
 1928

 1929
 1930
 1931
 1932 Washington
 1933 Washington State
 1934–  ?
 end date unknown

National Outdoor Intercollegiate Match
1905 – ?

Matches were initially held at Sea Girt, New Jersey; after several years Camp Perry, Ohio, became the perennial venue.

(This competition is not to be confused with the National ROTC outdoor rifle team championship for the William Randolph Hearst Team Trophy (first awarded circa 1922), which was not open to all students.)

 1905 Princeton
 1906 George Washington
 1907 not held

 1908 George Washington
 1909 George Washington
 1910 Massachusetts Agricultural
 1911

 1912
 1913 Massachusetts Agricultural
 1914 Massachusetts Agricultural
 1915  MIT
 1916 Norwich
 1917
 1918

 1919
 1920
 1921 US Naval Academy

 1922 Univ. of Dayton
 1923
 1924 Columbia
 1925– ?
 end date unknown

Skiing
1921–53

Beginning in 1921, an intercollegiate winter sports championship was held annually at Lake Placid, New York, and involved colleges from the US and Canada. It combined events from downhill and slalom skiing, cross-country skiing, and ski jumping, as well as speed skating, figure skating, and snowshoeing in some years. The overall winning team received the President Harding Trophy. Prior to the 1940s, in end-of-year accounts of national sporting champions, major newspapers regarded the winning team at Lake Placid as intercollegiate champion.

In the late 1930s, a major annual "four-way" (downhill, slalom, jumping and cross-country) intercollegiate event began in Sun Valley, Idaho. From the start it attracted not only college teams from the West, but also strong teams that traditionally participated in the Lake Placid meet, such as Dartmouth. After interruption by World War II, it usurped the older event.

Newspaper coverage referred to the 1946 and 1947 Sun Valley winners (Utah and Middlebury, respectively) as national champions. A few days earlier than the 1947 Sun Valley meet, a similar skiing competition was held in Aspen, Colorado, overlapping the start date of the Sun Valley event. In 1948 and 1949, Aspen, rather than Sun Valley, hosted the national "four-way" intercollegiate ski championships.

All of these competitions were held in the middle of the ski season rather than at the end. Then in 1950, an official annual post-season national championship event was established. This event served to influence the NCAA to add skiing as a sponsored sport, with the first NCAA title event occurring in 1954.

The Intercollegiate Ski Union (ISU), a conference of schools primarily in the Northeast, also conducted annual championship events for its members. However, its geographic reach was more limited than the other competitions described.

Lake Placid, New York

 1921–22  Dartmouth
 1922–23  Dartmouth
 1923–24  Dartmouth
 1924–25  Williams College
 1925–26  tie: Wisconsin, New Hampshire(Wisconsin won tiebreaker.)
 1926–27  New Hampshire
 1927–28  Wisconsin
 1928–29  New Hampshire
 1929–30  Dartmouth
 1930–31  Dartmouth

 1931–32  New Hampshire
 1932–33  New Hampshire †
 1933–34  Dartmouth
 1934–35  Dartmouth
 1935–36  Dartmouth
 1936–37  cancelled, lack of snow
 1937–38  Dartmouth
 1938–39 McGill Univ. (Montreal)
 1939–40  Middlebury
 1940–41  New Hampshire
 1941–42  team point title not awarded ‡

 1942–43  Middlebury
 1943–44  Dartmouth #
 1944–45  Dartmouth
 1945–46  not held (housing difficulties)
 1946–47  St. Lawrence Univ. (NY) §
 1947–48  St. Lawrence Univ. (NY) §
 1948–49  team point title not awarded ♦
 1949–50  cancelled, lack of snow
 1950–51  cancelled, not enough entries

† curtailed by bad weather (jump and snowshoe race held, last two events cancelled)
‡ lack of snow (cross-country and jump held, downhill and slalom cancelled)
# competition included non-collegians
♦ lack of snow (jump held, other events cancelled)
§ not regarded as national champion; included for completeness

Sun Valley, Idaho
 1937–38  Dartmouth
 1938–39  no apparent team title (individual only)
 1939–40  Washington
 1940–41  Washington
 1941–42  Washington
 1942–46  not held
 1946–47  Utah
 1947–48  Middlebury

Aspen, Colorado
 1947–48  Western State (CO) §
 1948–49  Middlebury
 1949–50  Denver

Post-Season National Championship
 1950  Dartmouth (venue: Arapahoe Basin, Colorado)
 1951  Denver (venue: Mt. Hood, Oregon)
 1952  Denver (venue: Snow Basin, Utah)
 1953  Washington State (venue: Snow Basin, Utah)

NCAA from 1954.

Soccer
During the periods 1926–35 and 1946–58, annual champions were selected by collegiate soccer associations based on regular season records.  All are considered unofficial.  For the period of 1936–45, each year's outstanding teams claim unofficial national championships. See also Intercollegiate Soccer Football Association.

The Soccer Bowl (played in 1950–52) attempted to settle the national championship on the field for the 1949, 1950 and 1951 seasons. The Soccer Bowl championship games were played in January, 1950; December, 1950; and February, 1952, respectively.

1949   Penn State tied San Francisco, 2–2 (co-champs)
1950   Penn State def. Purdue, 3–1
1951   Temple def. San Francisco, 2–0

NCAA from 1959.

Tennis
1883–1945

See Collegiate individual tennis champions

NCAA from 1946.

Tennis (indoor)
Intercollegiate Tennis Association (1973– )

1929 Lehigh (PA)
1930  Lehigh
1931  Yale
1973  Stanford
1974  Not held
1975  Stanford
1976  Stanford
1977  Trinity (TX)
1978  Stanford
1979  SMU
1980  California
1981  Not held
1982  Pepperdine
1983  SMU
1984  UCLA
1985  Stanford
1986  Pepperdine
1987  Southern California

1988  Southern California
1989  California
1990  Stanford
1991  UCLA
1992  Stanford
1993  UCLA
1994  Stanford
1995  Stanford
1996  UCLA
1997  UCLA
1998  Stanford
1999  UCLA
2000  Stanford
2001  UCLA
2002  Stanford
2003  Illinois
2004  Illinois
2005  Baylor

2006  Georgia
2007  Georgia
2008  Virginia
2009  Virginia
2010  Virginia
2011  Virginia
2012  Southern California
2013  Virginia
2014  Ohio State
2015  Oklahoma
2016  North Carolina
2017  Virginia
2018  Wake Forest 
2019  Ohio State
2020  Southern California
2021  North Carolina
2022  TCU

Track and field (indoor)
Amateur Athletic Union (1918)

Intercollegiate Association of Amateur Athletes of America (1923–64)

1918  Pennsylvania
1923  Pennsylvania
1924  Pennsylvania
1925  Georgetown
1926  Harvard
1927  Harvard
1928  Cornell
1929  New York Univ.
1930  Cornell, Pennsylvania
1931  Pennsylvania
1932  New York Univ.
1933  Yale
1934  Manhattan
1935  Manhattan
1936  Manhattan

1937  Columbia
1938  Columbia
1939  Manhattan
1940  New York Univ.
1941  Fordham
1942 Penn State
1943  New York Univ.
1944  Army
1945  Army
1946  not held
1947  New York Univ.
1948  New York Univ.
1949  Michigan State
1950  Michigan State

1951  Manhattan
1952  Manhattan
1953  Manhattan
1954  Yale
1955  Manhattan
1956  Manhattan
1957  Villanova
1958  Villanova
1959  Penn State
1960  Villanova
1961  Yale
1962  Villanova
1963  Villanova
1964  Villanova

NCAA from 1965.

Track and field (outdoor)
Intercollegiate Association of Amateur Athletes of America (1876–1920)

1876  Princeton
1877  Columbia
1878  Columbia
1879  Columbia
1880  Harvard
1881  Harvard
1882  Harvard
1883  Harvard
1884  Harvard
1885  Harvard
1886  Harvard
1887  Yale
1888  Harvard
1889  Yale
1890  Harvard

1891  Harvard
1892  Harvard
1893  Yale
1894  Yale
1895  Yale
1896  Yale
1897  Pennsylvania
1898  Pennsylvania
1899  Pennsylvania
1900  Pennsylvania
1901  Harvard
1902  Yale
1903  Yale
1904  Yale *
1905  Cornell

1906  Cornell
1907  Pennsylvania
1908  Cornell
1909  Harvard
1910  Pennsylvania
1911  Cornell
1912  Pennsylvania
1913  Pennsylvania †
1914  Cornell
1915  Cornell
1916  Cornell
1917  not held
1918  Cornell
1919  Cornell
1920  Pennsylvania

* University of Chicago won the 1904 Olympic Games collegiate championship meet, defeating Princeton, Illinois, Michigan State and Colgate.

† A contemporary source states, as part of an "international athletic games" (similar to the Olympics) in Chicago on June 28 – July 6, 1913, "The national intercollegiate track and field meet was won by the University of Michigan," with Southern California second and Chicago third.

NCAA from 1921.

Trampoline
Until 1969, men's trampoline was one of the events that comprised the NCAA gymnastics championships.  At that time, the event was removed. The NCAA continued to bestow a national title in trampoline for two years.
1969  Michigan
1970  Michigan
Discontinued after 1970.

Volleyball
United States Volleyball Association (1949–69)

1949 Southern California
1950 Southern California
1951 University of Mexico
1952 University of Mexico
1953 UCLA
1954 UCLA
1955 Florida State

1956 UCLA
1957 Florida State
1958 Florida State
1959 George Williams College (IL)
1960 George Williams College
1961 Santa Monica Community College
1962 Santa Monica Community College

1963 Santa Monica Community College
1964 Santa Monica Community College
1965 UCLA
1966 Santa Monica Community College
1967 UCLA
1968 San Diego State
1969 UC Santa Barbara

NCAA from 1970.

Molten Division III Men's Invitational Volleyball Championship Tournament (1997–2011)

This was a championship solely for NCAA Division III schools. It was discontinued after its 2011 edition when the NCAA announced it would organize an official Division III championship starting in 2012.

1997 Springfield
1998 Juniata
1999 La Verne
2000 UC San Diego
2001 Springfield

2002 Springfield
2003 Springfield
2004 Juniata
2005 Juniata
2006 Juniata

2007 Juniata
2008 Springfield
2009 Juniata
2010 Springfield
2011 Nazareth

NCAA from 2012.

Water polo
1913 Princeton 3, Illinois 1
NCAA from 1969.

Wrestling
1921  Penn State def. Indiana, 32–14, and Iowa Agricultural College, 28–18, in post-season dual meets among conference champions.
NCAA from 1928.

Women's teams

AIAW Champions in 16 NCAA Sports
See AIAW Champions for listings of pre-NCAA champions for most of the current NCAA women's sports.

Basketball
See DGWS/AIAW Basketball Champions (1969–82)

NCAA from 1982.

The Amateur Athletic Union (AAU) has since 1926 conducted United States championship tournaments for women's amateur teams.  On 28 occasions, small college teams (all from the central U.S.) have won the AAU women's basketball championship:  
 1932–33 (2) Oklahoma Presbyterian College
 1934–36 (3) Tulsa Business College
 1950, 58, 60, 62–69 (11)  Nashville Business College
 1954–57, 59, 61, 70–71, 74–75 (10)  Wayland Baptist College (Texas)
 1972–73 (2)  John F. Kennedy College (Nebraska)

Bowling
United States Bowling Congress (formerly American Bowling Congress and Women's Intercollegiate Bowling Congress)

The NCAA from 2004 has sponsored a women's team championship, apart from the USBC national championships.  There were 80 schools in all divisions participating in NCAA bowling as of April, 2018.

Fencing
Intercollegiate Women's Fencing Association (1929–63)

National Intercollegiate Women's Fencing Association (1964–79)

Until 1974, schools from the states of New York and New Jersey won every foil team title.

AIAW 1980–82 (3 years). NCAA 1982–89 (8 years). NCAA (Coed) from 1990.

Ice hockey
American Women's College Hockey Alliance

NCAA from 2001.

Rifle
National Rifle Association

NCAA (Coed) from 1980.

Pre-NCAA Coed Rifle: see above

Rowing
The National Women's Rowing Association (NWRA) sponsored an annual open eights national championship from 1971–1979, among college and non-college teams. (There were no eights before 1971.) During this period, only in 1973 and 1975 did a college team win the national eights championship outright. According to US Rowing Association, contemporary news reports in 1976 and 1977 do not mention a national collegiate title. Beginning in 1980, the NWRA sponsored the Women's Collegiate National Championship, including varsity eights.  In 1986 the NWRA dissolved after recognizing US Rowing's assuming of responsibility as the national governing body for women's rowing.

NWRA Open National Championship, Eights top college finishers, 1971–1979 (champion in parentheses) :
1971 Washington, 2nd overall (first place – Vesper Boat Club)
1972 Washington, 4th overall (first place – College Boat Club)
1973 Radcliffe College (NWRA open champion)
1974 Radcliffe College (first place – Vesper Boat Club)
1975 Wisconsin (NWRA open champion)
1976 Wisconsin (first place – College Boat Club)
1977 Wisconsin (first place – Vesper Boat Club)
1978 Wisconsin (first place – Burnaby Boat Club)
1979 Yale (first place – Burnaby Boat Club)

NWRA / US Rowing Women's Collegiate National Championship, Varsity eights :

* simultaneous AIAW championship, the only one conducted

Followed by NCAA from 1997, in which women currently compete in a Varsity 8, a Second Varsity 8, and a Varsity Four.

Beach volleyball
American Volleyball Coaches Association, Collegiate Nationals

NCAA from 2016.

Tennis (indoor)
Intercollegiate Tennis Association

Track and field (outdoor)
Women's National Collegiate and Scholastic Track Association

Telegraphic meets conducted during specified dates each May

Amateur Athletic Union

The AAU conducted senior women's national track and field championships for all athletes, both indoors and outdoors, beginning in the 1920s. Two college teams won numerous championships in each sport against other clubs from throughout the country.

Tuskegee Institute won the AAU national title 14 times in 1937–1942 and 1944–1951. Tennessee State won national outdoors 13 times in 1955–1960, 1962, 1963, 1965–1967, 1969 and 1978.

Track and field (indoor)
Amateur Athletic Union

Tuskegee Institute won the AAU national indoor championships four times in 1941, 1945, 1946 and 1948.  Tennessee State won the national title 14 times in 1956–1960, 1962, 1965–1969 and 1978–1980.

Water polo
USA Water Polo

NCAA from 2001.

Champions of collegiate athletic organizations

NCAA champions

NAIA champions

NJCAA champions

USCAA champions

ACCA champions

Other sports

References

+
Lists of sports championships